Stand Up and Cheer (also known as Johnny Mann's Stand Up and Cheer) is an American variety show that aired in syndication for three consecutive seasons (sponsored nationally by Chevrolet), beginning in 1971, hosted by Johnny Mann, with many musical numbers sung by "The Johnny Mann Singers".

Although the program occasionally featured comedy skits, most of the segments in the half-hour show involved patriotic musicals, singing, or dancing.

References

External links
 

1971 American television series debuts
1974 American television series endings
1970s American music television series
1970s American variety television series
English-language television shows
First-run syndicated television programs in the United States
Television series by Fremantle (company)